"Shame" is a song by American industrial rock band Stabbing Westward. The song was released as the second and final single from the band's 1996 album Wither Blister Burn & Peel.

Background

In a 2020 interview with Songfacts, lead singer Christopher Hall said:

Reception
In a retrospective overview of the band, Kyle Anderson of MTV said the song "remains a pretty solid anthem." Anderson also praised the video, saying it "is more clever than it has any right to be."

Music video
The video begins with a woman (Julie) running around and dancing in her living room. Her phone rings and the caller is her ex-boyfriend (Nick), who just escaped from a mental institution. Going to Julie's, Nick runs into a cop who he promptly kills. As Julie tries to run away and take the elevator, the officer's body falls on her before she continues running. Nick chases her to the building's roof, where he jumps at her and misses, falling to his death. The video is inter-cut with shots of the band performing the song in a room, leaving one by one before Hall is the only one left. The other members leave to see the movie, which is the Nick and Julie story.

Actors
 Christopher Hall as himself
 Walter Flakus as himself
 Andy Kubiszewski as himself
 Mark Eliopulos as himself
 Jim Sellers as himself
 Clint Curtis as Nick
 Unknown as Julie

Track listing
US single

Australian single

Austrian single

12" single

Charts

Personnel
 Christopher Hall – vocals, guitar
 Mark Eliopulos – guitar
 Jim Sellers – bass
 Walter Flakus – keyboards, programming
 Andy Kubiszewski – drums

References

1996 singles
Stabbing Westward songs
Columbia Records singles
1996 songs
Songs written by Andy Kubiszewski
Songs written by Christopher Hall (musician)